The Fort Montbarey is a fortified stronghold, built between 1777 and 1784, to the west of Brest.  The fort is similar to the related Questel Fort.

History  
This stronghold, built because Louis XVI of France wanted to make Brest impregnable, was the most important link in the defense of the city's west side, designed for 500-600 soldiers.

This fort was used by the Germans in 1944, who installed a parachute battalion during the siege of Brest by the Americans. After many assaults and heavy use of tanks and flamethrowers, the garrison surrendered on 16 September 1944.

Rebuilt after World War II, during the Cold War Fort Montbarey hosted the DCA (Defense Against Aircraft) command center of the port of Brest and had in its yard two large bunkers. It also had, at this time, a search radar for aircraft. These facilities were decommissioned in the late 1960s.

In 1984 Fort Montbarey was developed by the Navy into a museum on the history of Finistère during the Second World War, featuring the Resistance effort. An exhibition on "Brest in ruins" is also presented, as well as a "wagon of death" used in the Holocaust and many American vehicles and parts from the DCA (Defence Against Aviation) era, and a British Churchill tank. The museum also manages over 10,000 files and documents on the Resistance, and records on soldiers and victims of the Second World War. It annually hosts more than 10,000 visitors.

The fort is one of a series of strongholds that surround Brest, including Questel Fort.

Proposed themes  

  Visiting a stronghold of Louis XVI  
 Gallery 10000 Finistère died for France  
 Tribute to fallen World War Allies  
 Photos of Brest in ruins  
 Films about Brest at war  
 The wagon used in the deportation of Jews during the Holocaust.  
 Military vehicles classic  
 Various materials of the war 39/45  
 Exhibitions  
 Models of battle scenes

Gallery photos

References

Bibliography

External links  
 Presentation on the sitecheminsdememoire.gouv.fr

History of Brest, France
Brest, France
Fortifications of Brest, France
18th-century fortifications
Fortification lines
Redoubts
Fortifications articles needing attention to referencing and citation
Vauban fortifications in France
Buildings and structures in Finistère
18th-century architecture in France